In algebraic geometry, the Koras–Russell cubic threefolds are smooth affine complex threefolds diffeomorphic to studied by . They have a hyperbolic action of a one-dimensional torus with a unique fixed point, such that the quotients of the threefold and the tangent space of the fixed point by this action are isomorphic. They were discovered in the process of proving the Linearization Conjecture in dimension 3. This was later shown by Kaliman and Makar-Limanov using the ML-invariant of an affine variety, which has in fact been invented exactly for this purpose. 

Earlier than the above referred paper, Russell noticed that the hypersurface  has properties very similar to the affine 3-space like contractibility and was interested in distinguishing them as algebraic varieties.

References

3-folds